David Winters may refer to:

People
David Winters (footballer) (born 1983), Scottish footballer
David Winters (choreographer) (1939-2019), British-born American film director, producer, choreographer, and actor
Dave Winters (born 1952), American politician
David Winters, American naval officer and technologist who introduced Over-the-air rekeying

Characters
David Winters, fictional character portrayed by Paul Petersen in the 1958 film Houseboat
David Winters, fictional character portrayed by Christopher Plummer in the 2008 film Emotional Arithmetic

See also
David Winter (disambiguation)